Daren O'Leary (born 27 June 1973 in Harold Wood, England) was a rugby union player who represented Saracens, Harlequins, Gloucester, Worcester and Moseley.  Now retired, he is a professional rugby union agent with Top Marque Sports.

Whilst at Gloucester he started in the 2002 Zurich Championship Final (the year before winning the play-offs constituted winning the English title) in which Gloucester defeated Bristol.

O'Leary was part of the senior England squad for the 1993 Five Nations Championship and the 1997 England rugby union tour of Argentina and Australia, but was ultimately never capped at that level.

References

1973 births
Living people
Barbarian F.C. players
English people of Irish descent
English rugby union players
Moseley Rugby Football Club players
People from Harold Wood
Rugby union players from London Borough of Havering
Worcester Warriors players
Rugby union wings